Coddle Creek Township is a non-functioning civil township in Iredell County, North Carolina, United States. By the requirements of the North Carolina Constitution of 1868, the counties were divided into townships, including sixteen in Iredell County.  Part of the town of Mooresville is within Coddle Creek Township.

References

Townships in Iredell County, North Carolina
1868 establishments in North Carolina